France competed at the 1988 Winter Paralympics in Innsbruck, Austria. 16 competitors (15 men and 1 woman) won 13 medals, including 5 gold, 5 silver and 3 bronze. France finished 7th in the medal table. 

France competed in alpine skiing and cross-country skiing.

Alpine skiing 

Ten athletes (nine men, one woman) competed in alpine skiing. The medalists are:

  Bernard Baudean Men's Downhill LW3
  Tristan Mouric Men's Giant Slalom LW9
  Tristan Mouric Men's Slalom LW9
  Bernard Baudean Men's Giant Slalom LW3
  Tristan Mouric Men's Downhill LW9
  Stephane Saas Men's Downhill B2
  Stephane Saas Men's Giant Slalom B2
  Virginie Lopez Women's Giant Slalom LW2
  Virginie Lopez Women's Slalom LW2

Cross-country skiing 

Six athletes (all men) competed in cross-country skiing. The medalists are:

  Jean-Yves Arvier Men's Long Distance 20 km LW6/8
  Pierre Delaval Men's Short Distance 5 km LW5/7
  Pierre Delaval Men's Long Distance 15 km LW5/7
  Jean-Yves Arvier Men's Short Distance 10 km LW6/8

See also 

 France at the Paralympics
 France at the 1988 Winter Olympics

References 

France at the Paralympics
1988 in French sport
Nations at the 1988 Winter Paralympics